The Dabar Bridge is located between the Šibenik and Vrpolje interchanges of the A1 motorway in the Dalmatia region of Croatia.

Axis of the bridge is in a horizontal circular curve  in diameter.

Construction
The deck structure consists of longitudinal girders, cross-girders, and the deck. The abutments and the outermost piers support the structure through bearings while the remaining four piers are fixed to the deck structure. The longitudinal girders were manufactured in a special plant next to the bridge construction site and placed in the bridge structure using incremental launching.

Each motorway carriageway is supported by a separate set of piers. The abutments, on the other hand, are designed to support both of the carriageways. The cross-girders are placed at the abutments and the piers.

The Dabar Bridge was designed by Jure Radnić and constructed by Hidroelektra niskogradnja, Zagreb.

Traffic volume
Traffic is regularly counted and reported by Hrvatske autoceste, operator of the bridge and the A1 motorway where the bridge is located, and published by Hrvatske ceste. Substantial variations between annual (AADT) and summer (ASDT) traffic volumes are attributed to the fact that the bridge carries substantial tourist traffic to the Dalmatian Adriatic resorts. The traffic count is performed using analysis of motorway toll ticket sales.

See also
A1 motorway
List of arch bridges by length
List of bridges by length

References

Plate girder bridges
Bridges completed in 2005
Toll bridges in Croatia
Concrete bridges
Buildings and structures in Šibenik-Knin County
Transport in Šibenik-Knin County